GramTrans is a cross-platform machine translation platform developed in cooperation between Danish GrammarSoft ApS and Norwegian Kaldera Språkteknologi AS. The translation engine is transfer-based.

GramTrans offers free web-based translation for the Scandinavian languages, based on university research in natural language processing (NLP), corpus linguistics, and lexicography.

Languages
, the available translations are:

See also
 Comparison of machine translation applications
 Machine translation

External links
 GramTrans home page
 GrammarSoft ApS home page 

Machine translation software